The 2015 New Zealand gallantry awards were announced via a Special Honours List on 3 December 2015. Recipients are awarded New Zealand gallantry awards.

New Zealand Gallantry Star (NZGS)
 Major Geoffrey Michael Faraday – Royal New Zealand Armoured Corps.

New Zealand Gallantry Decoration (NZGD)
 Sergeant David John Duncan – Royal New Zealand Armoured Corps.

New Zealand Gallantry Medal (NZGM)
 Lance Corporal John Frank Manila Luamanu – Corps of Royal New Zealand Engineers.
 Lance Corporal Rory Patrick Malone – Royal New Zealand Infantry Regiment. Posthumous award.

References

Gallantry
Gallantry awards
New Zealand gallantry awards